Parnassius jacobsoni   is a high-altitude butterfly which is found only in   Tajikistan and Afghanistan. It is a member of the snow Apollo genus (Parnassius) of the swallowtail family (Papilionidae).

References
Heinkele, P., 2000: Beitrag zur revision des Parnassius-delphius-staudingeri-komplexes mit beschreibung einer neuen subspezies von Parnassius staudingeri Bang-Haas 1882 aus Afghanistan. (Lepidoptera: Papilionidae). Galathea, 16: 59-70
Weiss, J.C., 1999. The Parnassiinae of the world, Part 3. Hillside Books, Canterbury, U.K.

External links
Goran Waldeck Parnassius of the World Images

jacobsoni
Butterflies described in 1913